Harvey LeRoy "Lee" Atwater (February 27, 1951 – March 29, 1991) was an American political consultant and strategist for the Republican Party. He was an adviser to Republican U.S. presidents Ronald Reagan and George H. W. Bush and chairman of the Republican National Committee. Atwater aroused controversy through his aggressive campaign tactics, especially the Southern strategy.

Early life 
Atwater was born in Atlanta, Georgia, the son of Alma "Toddy" (Page), a school teacher, and Harvey Dillard Atwater, an insurance adjustor. He had two siblings, Ann and Joe. He grew up in Aiken, South Carolina. When Lee was five, his three-year-old brother, Joe (who bore apparent little young resemblance to him besides "striking blue eyes"), died of third-degree burns when he pulled a deep fryer full of hot oil onto himself.

As a teenager in Columbia, South Carolina, Atwater played guitar in a rock band, The Upsetters Revue. Even at the height of his political power, he would often play concerts in clubs and church basements, solo or with B.B. King, in the Washington, D.C., area. He released an album called Red Hot & Blue on Curb Records, featuring Carla Thomas, Isaac Hayes, Sam Moore, Chuck Jackson, and King. Robert Hilburn wrote about the album in the Los Angeles Times on April 5, 1990: "The most entertaining thing about this ensemble salute to spicy Memphis-style 1950s and 1960s R&B is the way it lets you surprise your friends. Play a selection such as 'Knock on Wood' or 'Bad Boy' for someone without identifying the singer, then watch their eyes bulge when you reveal that it's the controversial national chairman of the Republican Party, Lee Atwater." During the 1960s, Atwater briefly played backup guitar for Percy Sledge.

Atwater attended A.C. Flora High School. In 1973, Atwater graduated from Newberry College, a small private Lutheran institution in Newberry, South Carolina, where he was a member of the Alpha Tau Omega fraternity. At Newberry, Atwater served as the governor of the South Carolina Student Legislature. He earned a Master of Arts degree in communications from the University of South Carolina in 1977.

Political career 
During the 1970s and the 1980 election, Atwater rose to prominence in the South Carolina Republican Party, actively participating in the campaigns of Governor Carroll Campbell and Senator Strom Thurmond. During his years in South Carolina, Atwater became well known for managing hard-edged campaigns based on emotional wedge issues.

1980 and 1984 elections 

Atwater's aggressive tactics were first demonstrated during the 1980 Congressional campaigns. He was a campaign consultant to Republican incumbent Floyd Spence in his campaign for Congress against Democratic nominee Tom Turnipseed. Atwater's tactics in that campaign included push polling in the form of fake surveys by so-called independent pollsters to inform white suburbanites that Turnipseed was a member of the NAACP. He also sent out last-minute letters from Senator Thurmond telling voters that Turnipseed would disarm the United States, and turn it over to liberals and Communists. At a press briefing, Atwater planted a fake reporter who rose and said, "We understand that Turnipseed has had psychiatric treatment". Atwater later told reporters off the record that Turnipseed "got hooked up to jumper cables", referring to electroconvulsive therapy that Turnipseed underwent as a teenager. Spence went on to win the race.

After the 1980 election, Atwater went to Washington and became an aide in the Ronald Reagan administration, working under political director Ed Rollins. In 1984, Rollins managed Reagan's re-election campaign, and Atwater became the campaign's deputy director and political director. Rollins mentions Atwater's work several times in his 1996 book Bare Knuckles and Back Rooms. He states that Atwater ran a dirty tricks operation against Democratic vice-presidential nominee Geraldine Ferraro, including publicizing the fact that Ferraro's parents had been indicted on numbers running in the 1940s. Rollins also described Atwater as "ruthless", "Ollie North in civilian clothes", and someone who "just had to drive in one more stake".

Atwater became a senior partner at the political consulting firm of Black, Manafort, Stone and Kelly the day after the 1984 presidential election.

During his years in Washington, Atwater became aligned with Vice President George H. W. Bush, who chose Atwater to manage his 1988 presidential campaign.

"Southern strategy" 

As a member of the Reagan administration in 1981, Atwater gave an anonymous interview to political scientist Alexander P. Lamis. Part of the interview was printed in Lamis' book The Two-Party South, then reprinted in Southern Politics in the 1990s with Atwater's name revealed. Bob Herbert reported on the interview in the October 6, 2005, issue of The New York Times. On November 13, 2012, The Nation magazine released a 42-minute audio recording of the interview. James Carter IV, grandson of former president Jimmy Carter, had asked and been granted access to these tapes by Lamis' widow. Early in the interview, Atwater argued that Reagan did not need to make racial appeals, suggesting that Reagan's issues transcended the racial prism of the 1968 "Southern Strategy":

Atwater: But Reagan did not have to do a southern strategy for two reasons. Number one, race was not a dominant issue. And number two, the mainstream issues in this campaign had been, quote, southern issues since way back in the sixties. So Reagan goes out and campaigns on the issues of economics and of national defense. The whole campaign was devoid of any kind of racism, any kind of reference. And I'll tell you another thing you all need to think about, that even surprised me, is the lack of interest, really, the lack of knowledge right now in the South among white voters about the Voting Rights Act.

But later in the interview, Atwater was questioned about the implicitly racist aspects of the "New Southern Strategy" carried out by the Reagan campaign:

Atwater: As to the whole Southern strategy that Harry S. Dent, Sr. and others put together in 1968, opposition to the Voting Rights Act would have been a central part of keeping the South. Now you don't have to do that. All that you need to do to keep the South is for Reagan to run in place on the issues that he's campaigned on since 1964, and that's fiscal conservatism, balancing the budget, cut taxes, you know, the whole cluster.

Questioner: But the fact is, isn't it, that Reagan does get to the Wallace voter and to the racist side of the Wallace voter by doing away with legal services, by cutting down on food stamps?

Atwater: Y'all don't quote me on this. You start out in 1954 by saying, "Nigger, nigger, nigger". By 1968, you can't say "nigger"—that hurts you. Backfires. So you say stuff like forced busing, states' rights and all that stuff. You're getting so abstract now [that] you're talking about cutting taxes, and all these things you're talking about are totally economic things and a byproduct of them is [that] blacks get hurt worse than whites. And subconsciously maybe that is part of it. I'm not saying that. But I'm saying that if it is getting that abstract, and that coded, that we are doing away with the racial problem one way or the other. You follow me—because obviously sitting around saying, "We want to cut this", is much more abstract than even the busing thing, and a hell of a lot more abstract than "Nigger, nigger". So, any way you look at it, race is coming on the back-burner.

1988 election 

Atwater's most noteworthy campaign was the 1988 presidential election, when he served as the campaign manager for Republican nominee George H. W. Bush.

Dukakis supported a felon furlough program originally begun under Republican Governor Francis Sargent in 1972. In 1976, the Massachusetts legislature passed a measure to ban furloughs for first-degree murderers. Governor Dukakis vetoed the bill. Soon afterward, Willie Horton, who was serving a life sentence for first-degree murder for stabbing a boy to death during a robbery, was released on weekend furlough, during which he kidnapped a young couple, tortured the man, and repeatedly raped the woman. Horton then became the centerpiece of Atwater's ad campaign against Dukakis.

The issue of furlough for first-degree murderers was originally brought up by Democratic candidate Al Gore during a presidential primary debate. However, Gore never referred specifically to Horton. Dukakis had tried to portray himself as a moderate politician from the liberal state of Massachusetts. The Horton ad campaign only reinforced the public's general opinion that Dukakis was too liberal, which helped Bush overcome Dukakis' 17-percent lead in early public opinion polls, and win both the electoral and popular vote by landslide margins.

Although Atwater clearly approved of the use of the Willie Horton issue, the Bush campaign never ran any commercial with Horton's picture; instead they ran a similar but generic ad. The original commercial was produced by Americans for Bush, an independent group managed by Larry McCarthy, and Republicans benefited from the coverage it attracted in the national media. Referring to Dukakis, Atwater declared that he would "strip the bark off the little bastard" and "make Willie Horton his running mate". Atwater's challenge was to counter the "where was George?" campaign slogan Democrats were using as a rallying cry in an effort to create an impression that Bush was a relatively inexperienced and unaccomplished candidate. Furthermore, Bush had critics in the Republican base, who remembered his pro-choice positions in the 1980 primary, and that the harder the campaign pursued Dukakis's liberal positions, the bigger his base turnout would be.

During the election, a number of allegations were made in the media about Dukakis' personal life, including the unsubstantiated claim that his wife Kitty had burned a United States flag to protest the Vietnam War, and that Dukakis had been treated for a mental illness. In the film Boogie Man: The Lee Atwater Story, Robert Novak reveals for the first time that Atwater personally tried, but failed, to get him to spread these mental-health rumors.

The 1988 Bush campaign overcame a 17-point deficit in midsummer polls to win 40 states.

During that campaign, future President George W. Bush took an office across the hall from Atwater's, where his job was to serve as his father's eyes and ears. Bush wrote in his autobiography, "I was an allegiance enforcer and a listening ear." In her memoir, Barbara Bush said the younger Bush (whom Atwater called "Junior") and Atwater became "great friends."

RNC Chairman 
After the election, Atwater was named chairman of the Republican National Committee. Shortly after Atwater took over the RNC, Jim Wright, a Democrat, was forced to resign as Speaker of the House and was succeeded by Tom Foley.

On the day that Foley officially became speaker, the RNC began circulating a memo to Republican congresspeople and state party chairpeople called "Tom Foley: Out of the Liberal Closet". The memo compared Foley's voting record with that of openly gay Congressman Barney Frank, with a subtle implication that Foley, too, was gay. It had been crafted by RNC communications director Mark Goodin and by House Minority Whip Newt Gingrich. In fact, Gingrich had been attempting to convince several reporters to print it. The memo was harshly condemned by both political parties. Republican Senate leader Bob Dole, for instance, said in a speech in the Senate chamber, "This is not politics. This is garbage".

Atwater initially defended the memo, calling it "no big deal" and "factually accurate". However, some days later, he claimed that he had not approved the memo. Under pressure from Bush, Atwater fired Goodin, replacing him with B. Jay Cooper.

Following Bush's victory, Atwater focused on organizing a public relations campaign against Arkansas governor Bill Clinton. Atwater viewed Clinton as a serious potential threat to Bush in the 1992 presidential election. At the time of Atwater's illness, he was supporting the bid of Representative Tommy Robinson for the Republican gubernatorial nomination to oppose Clinton in the fall. Robinson lost the primary to former Arkla Gas CEO Sheffield Nelson.

In 1989, Atwater became a member of the historically black Howard University Board of Trustees. The university gained national attention when students rose up in protest against Atwater's appointment. Student activists disrupted Howard's 122nd anniversary celebrations and eventually occupied the university's administration building. Within days, both Atwater and Howard President James E. Cheek resigned.

Also in 1989, Atwater strongly criticized the candidacy of David Duke for the Louisiana House of Representatives. He said: "David Duke is not a Republican as far as I am concerned...He is a pretender, a charlatan, and a political opportunist who is looking for any organization he can find to legitimate his views of racial and religious bigotry and intolerance...We repudiate him and his views and we are taking steps to see that he is disenfranchised from our party."

Musical career 

In 1988, Atwater and several friends founded a restaurant named Red Hot & Blue in Arlington, Virginia. The restaurant, which has since grown into a chain, served Memphis BBQ and played Memphis blues music in the dining room.

Atwater recorded a 1990 album with B.B. King and others on Curb Records, titled Red Hot & Blue. He also performed with Paul Shaffer and his band in an episode of Late Night with David Letterman.

Personal life

Marriage and children 

Atwater married Sally Dunbar (1951–2021) in 1978. They had three children, Sara Lee, Ashley Page, and Sally Theodosia. His widow ran for Superintendent of Education for South Carolina in 2014. She was endorsed by former President George H. W. Bush.

Illness 
On March 5, 1990, Atwater suffered a seizure during a fundraising breakfast for Senator Phil Gramm. Doctors discovered a grade 3 astrocytoma, an aggressive form of brain cancer, in his right parietal lobe. He underwent interstitial implant radiationthen a new treatmentat Montefiore Medical Center in New York City, followed by conventional radiation therapy at George Washington University Hospital in Washington, D.C. The treatment left him paralyzed on his left side, disabled his tone discrimination, and swelled his face and body.

Conversion to Catholicism and repentance 
In the months after the severity of his illness became apparent, Atwater said he had converted to Catholicism, through the help of Fr. John Hardon. In an act of repentance, Atwater issued a number of public and written letters to individuals to whom he had been opposed during his political career. In a June 28, 1990, letter to Tom Turnipseed, he stated, "It is very important to me that I let you know that out of everything that has happened in my career, one of the low points remains the so-called 'jumper cable' episode", adding, "My illness has taught me something about the nature of humanity, love, brotherhood, and relationships that I never understood, and probably never would have. So, from that standpoint, there is some truth and good in everything."

In a February 1991 article for Life, Atwater wrote:

In the article Atwater apologized to Michael Dukakis for the "naked cruelty" of the 1988 presidential election campaign.

Ed Rollins stated in the 2008 documentary Boogie Man: The Lee Atwater Story:

Death 
Atwater died on March 29, 1991, from a brain tumor. He was 40 years old.

Funeral services were held at the Trinity Cathedral Church in Atwater's final residence, Columbia, South Carolina. A memorial service was held at the Washington National Cathedral on April 4, 1991.

Legacy 
Sidney Blumenthal has speculated that, had Atwater lived, he would have run a stronger re-election campaign for Bush than the president's unsuccessful 1992 effort against Bill Clinton and Ross Perot.

Atwater's political career is the subject of the 2008 feature-length documentary film Boogie Man: The Lee Atwater Story.

Atwater appears in the second season of the 2019 alternate history web television series For All Mankind, where he is played by Dustin Seavey.

See also 
 Starve the beast (Policy)
 Karl Rove

References

Further reading 
 Lee Atwater and T. Brewster, "Lee Atwater's Last Campaign," Life magazine, February 1991, p. 67.
 
 John Joseph Brady, Bad Boy: The Life and Politics of Lee Atwater, 1997, .
 Alexander P. Lamis, ed., Southern Politics in the 1990s, 1999, .
 Alexander P. Lamis, The Two-Party South, 1990, .
 American National Biography. Supplement 1, pp. 18–19. New York: Oxford University Press, 2002.
 The Scribner Encyclopedia of American Lives. Volume 3, 1991–1993, pp. 37–38. New York: Charles Scribner's Sons, 2001.
 "I'm Still Lee Atwater". The Washington Post.

External links 

 
 
 

1951 births
1991 deaths
20th-century Roman Catholics
American campaign managers
American political consultants
Catholics from Georgia (U.S. state)
Catholics from South Carolina
College Republicans
Converts to Roman Catholicism from Lutheranism
Deaths from brain cancer in Washington, D.C.
Former Lutherans
Newberry College alumni
People from Aiken, South Carolina
People from Atlanta
Republican National Committee chairs
South Carolina Republicans
United States presidential advisors
University of South Carolina alumni
20th-century American guitarists
Guitarists from Georgia (U.S. state)
American rock guitarists
American rhythm and blues guitarists
A.C. Flora High School alumni